Daredevil: Reborn is a four-issue comic book limited series published by Marvel Comics. Following the events of Shadowland, Matt Murdock has left Hell's Kitchen behind. The story involves Matt entering Mexico, where he deals with a small town's incident. The series was released in 2011 written by Andy Diggle.

Plot
While walking away from New York, Matt arrives at a diner outside a small Mexican town, where he helps a young blind boy fend off bullies, and gives him advice about how to cope with his disability, only to be turned away by the hostile local police. Unable to overcome his curiosity, Matt follows them and discovers a mass grave outside the city, along with a large amount of secret weapons. He discovers that the corrupt police are involved in an illegal trade with a drug smuggler named Calavera. Despite Calavera's mysterious telepathic ability to draw out and exploit Murdock's sins, the ordeal leaves Matt reassured in himself and his responsibilities, and he begins preparations to return to New York and rebuild his legal and vigilante careers.

References
After SHADOWLAND, Andy Diggle Debuts a DAREDEVIL: REBORN, Newsarama, January 11, 2011

Daredevil (Marvel Comics) storylines
Comics set in New York City